The Man Who Took a Chance is a 1917 American silent comedy drama film directed by William Worthington and starring Franklyn Farnum, Agnes Vernon and Lloyd Whitlock.

Cast
 Franklyn Farnum as Monty Gray
 Agnes Vernon as Constance Lanning
 Lloyd Whitlock as Wilbur Mason
 Countess Du Cello as Mrs. Lanning
 Mark Fenton as Richard Lanning 
 Charles Perley as The Duke of Cannister
 Arthur Hoyt as James

References

Bibliography
 George A. Katchmer. Eighty Silent Film Stars: Biographies and Filmographies of the Obscure to the Well Known. McFarland, 1991.

External links
 

1917 films
1917 comedy films
1910s English-language films
American silent feature films
Silent American comedy films
American black-and-white films
Universal Pictures films
Films directed by William Worthington
1910s American films